Xylouris,  Xilouris is a Greek surname Ξυλούρης. Notable people with the surname include:

Giorgos Xylouris (born 1965), Greek musician
Nikos Xylouris (1936–1980), Greek composer
Nikos Xylouris (swimmer) (born 1982), Greek swimmer

Greek-language surnames
Surnames